A Marine expeditionary force (MEF), formerly known as a Marine amphibious force, is the largest type of a Marine air-ground task force. A MEF is the largest building block of United States Marine Corps combat power.



Structure
A MEF is larger than a Marine expeditionary unit (MEU) or Marine expeditionary brigade (MEB).

Each MEF consists of a MEF Information Group (MIG) as the command element, a Marine division (MARDIV) as the ground combat element, a Marine aircraft wing (MAW) as the aviation combat element, and a Marine logistics group (MLG) as the logistics combat element.

The MEF also contains a Special Operations Training Group (SOTG) and is the training section component for the MEU and MEB.  The SOTG oversees the training and evaluation exercises for the MEU's annual Special Operations Capable Certification.

Organization
A MEF also commands several smaller MAGTFs, including MEBs and MEUs.

List of MEFs

I Marine Expeditionary Force
Camp Pendleton, California

II Marine Expeditionary Force
Camp Lejeune, North Carolina

III Marine Expeditionary Force
Camp Butler, Okinawa, Japan

Marine Forces Reserve
New Orleans, Louisiana

United States Marine Corps organization
Expeditionary units and formations